Opasne vode is the fifth studio album by Bosnian recording artist Maya Berović, released on 27 October 2014 through City Records. The record, containing nine pop-folk songs, was written by Marina Tucaković and Damir Handanović. It was produced by Handanović as well. This was last album Berović recorded in Bosnian.

The club-oriented "Alkohol" (Alcohol) was Maya's entry at the 2014 Pink Music Festival. The second song from the album, "Čime me drogiraš", had a premier on the popular late-night talk show Ami G Show hosted by Ognjen Amidžić in September 2014. Other songs were uploaded to YouTube alongside visuals directed by Dejan Milićević.

Track listing 
All lyrics written by Marina Tucaković and all music composed and arranged by Damir Handanović.

Release history

References

External links
Opasne Vode by Maya Berović at Discogs

2014 albums
Maya Berović albums
City Records albums